Au rendez-vous du rêve abêti is a Togolese documentary film directed by Kodjo Goncalves. It was released in 1979 and shot in 16mm.
It runs for 15 minutes.

References

External links
 

1979 films
Togolese films
1979 documentary films
1970s short documentary films